Pete Rios was a member of the Arizona House of Representatives and the Arizona Senate, serving two stretches in the Senate and a single term in the House. He first ran, unsuccessfully, for the House in 1980. In 1982 he ran for the State Senate, winning the seat from Arizona's 7th District. He won re-election in 1984, 1986, 1988, 1990, and 1992. He served as the Senate President during the 40th Legislature from 1991 to 1992. In 1994, he did not run for re-election to the Senate, instead choosing to run for the Arizona Secretary of State, a bid for which he was unsuccessful. In 1996 Rios once again ran for the Senate, regaining his seat in District 7. He won election three times, the first two in 1998 and 2000 to District, and then to District 23 in 2002, after re-districting. In 2004, due to Arizona's term limit laws, Rios was unable to run again for the Senate, and chose to run for the House seat from District 23, which he won. He won re-election in 2006. He did not run for re-election in 2008.

References

 

Democratic Party members of the Arizona House of Representatives
Democratic Party Arizona state senators
Hispanic and Latino American state legislators in Arizona
Living people
Year of birth missing (living people)
Presidents of the Arizona Senate